Corciolli (born 8 January 1968), is a Brazilian composer, instrumentalist and producer. He is best known for his work with electronic, contemporary classical and ambient crossover music, including original soundtracks.

Biography

Corciolli was born in the city of São Paulo, Brazil in 1968 and began to study classical piano at the age of 13 with Nair Tabet, assistant of Magdalena Tagliaferro. With Cacho Souza and later with Claudio Leal Ferreira, he delved in the art of harmonizing and improvising Jazz and Brazilian music. However, it was the electronic synthesizers, with their unlimited sonic variables, that deepened his relationship with music and composition.

He graduated with a degree in architecture, without ever leaving the music aside. Over the years, he played in several bands and also as a solo pianist, but it was the Brazilian bass legend Celso Pixinga and soon after, with the rhumba flamenco band Espírito Cigano, that consolidated his musical and professional experience. In 1992, he left the band in search of his own melodies.

A year later, he founded the record label Azul Music, releasing his first solo album “All That Binds Us”. In 1995 came out the album “Unio Mystica”, a daring musical suite recorded in the Monastery of São Bento, São Paulo, Brazil, with Gregorian chants, medieval Latin lyrics, a lead soprano voice and orchestral arrangements. Acclaimed by the public and critics, the album was released in 40 countries and received a special blessing from Pope John Paul II. The following year, Corciolli performed with the Tibetan Monks of Gaden Shartse in two memorable concerts at the Latin America Memorial, in São Paulo, Brazil. With the monks, he recorded and released the album “The New Moon of East”, the first-ever encounter of sacred Tibetan tradition with the music of a Western composer.

As an independent artist, his remarkable accomplishments include more than 2 million CDs sold; Participation in soundtracks and international compilations alongside artists like Hans Zimmer, Vangelis, Enigma, The Alan Parsons Project, Sarah Brightman and Luciano Pavarotti among others; He has produced several artists and coordinated hundreds of projects for Azul Music label, including 2 collections of albums for the outstanding Brazilian magazine “Caras”, which together sum 12 million CDs marketed in newsstands all over Brazil.

In recent years, he has been dedicating himself to film soundtracks composition, incorporating the language of the synthesizers to the acoustic and orchestral sounds.

Discography 

Albums
 All That Binds Us (1993)
 Unio Mystica (1995)
 The New Moon of East (with Tibetan Monks of Gaden Shartse) (1997)
 Exotique (1998)
 Unio Celestia (1999)
 Shaman (2001)
 Sea (2001)
 Angels (2001)
 Yoga (2001)
 Feng Shui (2001)
 Reiki (2001)
 Colors (2001)
 Aroma (2001)
 Nature (2001)
 Celts (2001)
 Art of Seduction (2001)
 A Glance (2004)
 Footprints (2005)
 Songs for the Ocean (2007)
 The Astral City (2008)
 Lightwalk (2009)
 Lightwalk (Live at Auditorio Ibirapuera) (2010)
 Messengers of Light, Vol. 1 (2010)
 Messengers of Light, Vol. 2 (2010)
 Messengers of Light, Vol. 3 (2010)
 O Filme dos Espíritos (Music from the Motion Picture)(2011)
 The Very Best of (2011)
 Infinito (2015)
 Ilusia (2017)
 Jubilee (2018)
 Imaginary Brazil (2019)
 Futura (with Emmanuele Baldini) (2020)
 Silent Worlds (2021)
 No Time But Eternity (2021)

Other projects
 Trilhas - Gel Campannatti (1994)
 Girassol - Ed Ribeiro Lima & Cia. (1994)
 Planeta & Planeta NovaEra (1994-1998)
 Aquilon with Alpha Phoenix (1996)
 As Sete Tentações da Vida - Original Soundtrack (with Luiz Gasparetto) (2000)
 A Energia Musical dos Números (with Aparecida Liberato) (2001)
 Corciolli in the Mix - Various Artists (2001)	
 Notas Suaves, Momentos Serenos (2004) Reader's Digest
 Caras Zen (2004) Caras
 Essas Mulheres (2005) Record TV
 Solaris 3 (2005) Som Livre
 Música do Mundo (2005) Caras
 Mentalize - Andre Matos (2009)	
 Cris Cabianca - Cris Cabianca (2011)
 No Grão de Areia, o Sol - Ana Ariel (2012)
 Salve Regina - Juliano Ravanello (2013)
 Vanilla - Cris Cabianca (2014)
 Reminiscences, Vol. 2 - Clara Sverner (2020)
 Reminiscences, Vol. 1 - Clara Sverner (2020)

Soundtracks 
 Fala Sério! (Director: Augusto Sevá) (2010) Albatroz Cinematográfica
 O Filme dos Espíritos (Director: André Marouço, Michel Dubret) (2011) Mundo Maior / Paris Filmes
 Tais & Taiane (Director: Augusto Sevá) (2021) Albatroz Cinematográfica / Pandora Filmes

References

 , "Nosso Lar", DailyOM, posted in September 2008
 , "Corciolli e seu amor pela música", Caras, posted on April 25, 2011
 , "Paulista Corciolli lança novo CD e mantém música instrumental em alta", Correio Braziliense, posted on May 4, 2015, by Adriana Izel
 , "Tecladista brasileiro lança álbum de rock progressivo instrumental", Clique ABC, posted on June 7, 2017
 , “Ilusia album review", Progvisions, posted in July 2017, by Douwe Fledderus
 , "Ilusia - a studio release by Corciolli", Proggnosis, posted on July 12, 2017, by Marc Roy
 , "Ilusia Recensioni", Artists and Bands, posted on July 25, 2017, by Bartolomeo Varchetta
 , "Record of the Month", Progressive Rock & Progressive Metal, posted in September 2017, by Carlos Alberto Vaz Ferreira
 , "Corciolli apresenta repertório autoral que mescla música erudita com sintetizadores eletrônicos no dia 24 em Piracicaba", Jornal O Regional, posted on August 23, 2018
 , "Corciolli celebra 25 anos de carreira", posted on August 28, 2018
 , "Celebrando 25 anos de lançamento, compositor e tecladista Corciolli relança álbum de estreia em formato digital", Jornal São Paulo Zona Sul, posted on October 19, 2018
 , "Compositor e tecladista Corciolli lança vídeo com música em homenagem ao Aleijadinho no mês de aniversário de 204 anos de seu falecimento", Terra, posted on November 19, 2018
 , "FUTURA de Corciolli & Emmanuele Baldini", Jornal União, posted on November 6, 2020
 , "Corciolli : quand la musique révèle toute la richesse de la planète…", Mazik, posted on September 21, 2021, by Mathilde Vivier
 , "Corciolli Unveils Ulimwengu Video featuring Eric Wainaina and Vini Ngugi", posted on October 22, 2021, by World Music Central News Department
 , "Musiques & Vibrations du Monde, Dans les Bacs", AuxSons, posted on October 29, 2021, by Nicolas Alice

External links
Official Site
Instagram Page
Official YouTube Channel
Facebook Page
Twitter Page
Soundcloud Page

Brazilian electronic musicians
Brazilian keyboardists
1968 births
Living people